Guneswar Das is an Indian politician. In 2011 he was elected as MLA of Raha Vidhan Sabha Constituency in Assam Legislative Assembly. He is an All India United Democratic Front politician.

References

Year of birth missing (living people)
All India United Democratic Front politicians
Assam politicians
Living people